Saajan Bina Suhagan is a 1978 Indian Hindi-language drama film produced and directed by Saawan Kumar Tak. The film stars Rajendra Kumar, Nutan, Vinod Mehra, Padmini Kohlapure and Shreeram Lagoo, the film's music is by Usha Khanna. It has a popular song "Madhuban Khushboo Deta Hai" sung by Yesudas, Anuradha Paudwal and Hemlata. The film was remade in Tamil as Mangala Nayagi in 1980 and remade in Malayalam as Oru Kochukatha Aarum Parayathe Katha in 1984.

Synopsis

Asha Nutan lives a poor lifestyle along with her widowed father. She is madly in love with an aspiring doctor Raj Kumar Rajendra Kumar and hopes she will marry him when he completes his studies. When Raj abruptly announces that he has to travel abroad in order to complete his studies, Asha although not wanting to, but has no choice but to wait for him whilst his studies are complete so they can marry. 
When Asha's  father whilst on his deathbed, makes her promise to marry Simla-based Gopal Chopra Shreeram Lagoo who is the son of his friend, Shyamlal,  Asha has no choice but to agree to her father's dying wish. 
The marriage takes place and soon they become parents of three daughters, Basanti  Radha Bartake - a tomboy, who excels in self-defense; Barkha Aarti Chopra an aspiring dancer, and Bulbul Padmini Kolhapure who wants to be a professional piano player and is currently on medication due to a hole in her heart. Gopal gets a promotion and re-locates to Bombay but continues to remain in touch with his family. Then the past is re-visited when Raj, now a doctor, comes to live in their neighborhood. He meets with Asha, and decides to teach Bulbul piano lessons, while his brother, Advocate Anand Vinod Mehra romances Basanti. Their idyllic lives are shattered when Raj is arrested for killing a man named Mangatram who was blackmailing Asha for hiding a secret from the rest of her family.

Cast
 Rajendra Kumar as Raj Kumar
 Nutan as Asha Chopra
 Vinod Mehra as Anand
 Shreeram Lagoo as Gopal Chopra
 Radha Bartake as Basanti Chopra (as World Teen Princess Kasturi)
 Aarti Chopra as Barkha Chopra
 Padmini Kolhapure as BulBul Chopra
 Leela Mishra as Chopra's neighbor
 Satyendra Kapoor as Dr. Malhotra
 Nana Palsikar as Asha's Father
 Pinchoo Kapoor as Guest appearance
 Chandrashekhar as Guest appearance
 Jankidas as Guest appearance

Music
The film has music by Usha Khanna and lyrics by Indivar

 "Madhuban Khushboo Deta Hai, Saagar Saawan Deta hai" (version 1) - K.J. Yesudas
 "Madhuban Khushboo Deta Hai, Saagar Saawan Deta hai" (version 1) - K.J. Yesudas
 "O Mamma, Dear Mamma, Happy Birthday To You" - Aarti Mukherjee, Chandrani Mukherjee, Shivangi Kapoor
 "Kaise Jeet Lete Hain Log Dil Kisi Ka" - Mohammad Rafi
 "Sata Sata Ke Khush Hote ho" - Suman Kalyanpur
 "Jijaji Jijaji, Honewale Jijaji" - Anuradha Paudwal, Suresh Wadkar, Dilraj Kaur 
 "O Jaani, Jaani Tum O Jaane Tum" - Asha Bhosle
 "Madhuban Khushboo Deta Hai, Saagar Saawan Deta Hai" (duet) - K.J. Yesudas, Anuradha Paudwal
 "Madhuban Khushboo Deta Hai, Saagar Saawan Deta hai" (female) - Usha Khanna

References

External links 
 

1978 films
1970s Hindi-language films
Hindi films remade in other languages
Films scored by Usha Khanna
Films directed by Saawan Kumar Tak
1978 drama films
Indian drama films